Spanish Fort is a city in Baldwin County, Alabama, United States, located on the eastern shore of Mobile Bay. The 2020 census lists the population of the city as 10,049. It is a suburb of Mobile and is part of the Daphne-Fairhope-Foley metropolitan area.

City Hall
In November 2012, Spanish Fort built a community center to house its administrative offices and city amenities. The center is home to the city library, administrative offices, the office of the mayor, and other city-run services. The municipal complex is roughly 30,000 square feet and cost around $5 million to build. It sits on 17-acres of prime land and features a large pond with two fountains and a pavilion. The city also hosts community outreach events along with city council and budget meetings.

Geography
Spanish Fort is located at 30°40'7.403" North, 87°55'19.844" West (30.668723, -87.922179), above the east shore of the Blakeley River where it enters Mobile Bay. U.S. Routes 90 and 98 (Battleship Parkway) lead west across the Mobile River and its distributaries  to Mobile. Interstate 10 passes just to the south of Spanish Fort, with access from exits 35 and 38, and leads west across Mobile Bay to Mobile as well.

Demographics

2010 Census Data
As of the census of 2010, there were 6,798 people, 2,861 households, and 1,910 families residing in the city. The racial makeup of the city was 91.0% White, 4.8% Black or African American, 0.6% Native American, 1.4% Asian, 0.7% from other races, and 1.4% from two or more races. 2.4% of the population were Hispanic or Latino of any race.

There were 2,861 households, out of which 29.0% had children under the age of 18 living with them, 53.9% were married couples living together, 9.0% had a female householder with no husband present, and 33.2% were non-families. 28.0% of all households were made up of individuals, and 12.6% had someone living alone who was 65 years of age or older. The average household size was 2.37 and the average family size was 2.93.

In the city, the population was 23.0% under the age of 18, 7.4% from 18 to 24, 24.4% from 25 to 44, 28.4% from 45 to 64, and 16.8% who were 65 years of age or older. The median age was 41.5 years. For every 100 females, there were 95.7 males. For every 100 females age 18 and over, there were 100.9 males. The median income for a household in the city was $65,244, and the median income for a family was $76,469. Males had a median income of $58,958 versus $36,695 for females. The per capita income for the city was $32,856. About 1.8% of families and 3.2% of the population were below the poverty line, including 1.1% of those under age 18 and 2.8% of those age 65 or over.

2020 Census Data

The 2020 Census calculated a population in Spanish Fort, Alabama as 10,049, with 3,278 households and 1,946 families. With a 47.8% increase in population from the 2010 census, Spanish Fort is now the 2nd fastest growing city in the state of Alabama, right behind Gulf Shores, Alabama.

Economic development 
Since incorporating on July 19, 1993, Spanish Fort has seen significant growth. Eastern Shore Centre, an open air regional shopping complex, opened on November 17, 2004. Spanish Fort Town Center, anchored by Bass Pro Shops, J. C. Penney, and Kohl's, contributed to the municipality's substantial commercial development, despite having ongoing issues with vacancies.   J.C. Penney announced it would close its store there in 2021.

History 

The city of Spanish Fort is rich in history dating as far back as 1712 with the founding of Mobile by Jean-Baptiste Le Moyne de Bienville of France. Spanish Fort was originally the site of a trading post established by French-occupied Mobile. Following the French and Indian War, a large area on the Gulf Coast including the trading post was ceded to the British in 1763. During the Revolutionary War after the Spanish took Mobile and surrounding areas in the Battle of Fort Charlotte, a presidio or military fort was built on the site of the old trading post. This "Spanish Fort" was the site of a counterattack by British forces dispatched from Pensacola in 1781. The British were driven back and unsuccessful in recapturing the area. Following the Adams–Onís Treaty, Spanish Fort, as it was now commonly referred to, was officially property of the United States.

During the American Civil War, Spanish Fort was heavily fortified as an eastern defense to the city of Mobile. Fort Huger, Fort (Battery) Tracey, Fort (Battery) McDermott, Fort Alexis, Red Fort, and Old Spanish Fort were all part of the Mobile defenses in what is now Spanish Fort. After the Union victory in the Battle of Mobile Bay, Mobile nevertheless remained in Confederate hands. Union forces embarked on a land campaign in early 1865 to take Mobile from the east. Spanish Fort was the site of the Battle of Spanish Fort in the Mobile Campaign of the war. Its fall allowed Union forces to concentrate on Fort Blakeley to the north, and hence destroy the last organized resistance east of the Mississippi River. The falls of Spanish Fort and Fort Blakeley permitted Union troops to subsequently enter Mobile unopposed after the conclusion of the Civil War.

On November 1, 2012, groundbreaking ceremonies were held at the northwest corner of Spanish Fort Boulevard and Blakeley Way (map), site of the new Spanish Fort Community Center.  Forrest Daniell & Associates, P.C., was contracted to design the center, working with the City's Community Center Advisory Board on the conceptualization and functionality of the facility.  J.F. Pate & Associates was awarded the contract to construct the Community Center.  Though progress on the construction was often hindered by rainy weather and other hurdles, the administrative staff officially occupied the new facility in September 2015. The center is home to the city library, administrative offices, the office of the mayor, and other city-run services. The municipal complex is roughly 30,000 square feet and cost the city approximately $5 million to build.

Education 
Spanish Fort is a part of the Baldwin County Public Schools system under direction of Superintendent Eddie Tyler. Two elementary schools, a middle school, and a high school serve Spanish Fort. Both the elementary school and high school have had substantial building additions in recent years as the enrollment numbers rise. Baldwin County Public Schools was approved by the County Commission to establish a four-year, $60 million loan to fund the new additions across the county.

Schools 

Secondary schools
 Spanish Fort High School (9-12)
 Spanish Fort Middle School (6-8)
Elementary schools (both K-5)
 Spanish Fort Elementary School 
 Rockwell Elementary School
 Stonebridge Elementary School

See also

Eastern Shore (Alabama)

Notes

External links
City of Spanish Fort official website
Historic Blakeley State Park, north of the city
5 Rivers Delta Resource Center

Cities in Alabama
Cities in Baldwin County, Alabama
Populated places established in 1712
Populated coastal places in Alabama